Ilija Bozoljac and Dušan Vemić were the defending champions and they tried to defend their title. Unfortunately, they retired in his match against Mark Ein and Kevin Kim already in the first round (when the result was 2–1 for American pair).
Santiago González and Simon Stadler defeated Treat Conrad Huey and Harsh Mankad 6–2, 5–7, [10–4] in the final match.

Seeds

Draw

Draw

References
 Doubles Draw
 Qualifying Doubles Draw

Calabasas Pro Tennis Championships - Doubles
Calabasas Pro Tennis Championships